Freshfield Nunatak is an isolated nunatak rising to about  to the southeast of the Herbert Mountains in the Shackleton Range, Antarctica. It was photographed from the air by the U.S. Navy, 1967, and surveyed by the British Antarctic Survey, 1968–71. In association with the names of pioneers of polar life and exploration grouped in this area, it was named by the UK Antarctic Place-Names Committee in 1971 after Douglas W. Freshfield, an English geographer and mountaineer in the Caucasus Mountains and the Himalayas.

References

Nunataks of Coats Land